The Women's slalom competition of the Innsbruck 1976 Olympics was held at Axamer Lizum.

The defending world champion was Hanni Wenzel of Liechtenstein, while Switzerland's Lise-Marie Morerod was the defending World Cup slalom champion and Germany's Rosi Mittermaier was the leader of the 1976 World Cup.

Results

References 

Women's slalom
Alp
Oly
Women's slalom